Chak De! India (English: Go For it! India or Go! India) is the title song of the 2007 Hindi sports film Chak De! India. It is sung by Sukhwinder Singh, Salim Merchant, Marianne D'Cruz and was composed by the duo Salim–Sulaiman and lyrics penned by Jaideep Sahni.

The soundtrack for Chak De! India was released on 1 August 2007 and was composed by Salim–Sulaiman with lyrics by Jaideep Sahni. Since the release of the film, the title track song, "Chak De! India" became a frequently-played sports anthem. Salim Merchant has stated in this regard that "Chak De! India," "almost became the sports anthem of the country, especially after India won the 2011 Cricket World Cup. It was no longer our song but the country's song." Indeed, after winning the 2011 Cricket World Cup,  India's team player Virat Kohli "sang Chak de India to the crowd." A few years later, after India beat South Africa at the 2015 Cricket World Cup, Nitin Srivastava of the BBC noted that: "MCG has erupted with Vande Mataram (the national song of India) and Chak De India (Go India!) slogans in the air! And there's no age barrier for cricket fans who came and enjoyed the match."

Awards
NDTV Poll
Won: Best Song (Chak De! India)

References

External links

Lyrics of this song

2007 songs
Hindi film songs
Indian songs
Songs about India
Sukhwinder Singh songs
Songs with music by Salim–Sulaiman
Songs with lyrics by Jaideep Sahni